The 4700th Air Defense Group  is a discontinued United States Air Force (USAF) organization. Its last assignment was with the 4709th Air Defense Wing at Stewart Air Force Base, New York. It was activated in 1950 as a support unit for USAF units at Stewart.  In 1954, it assumed an operational mission and was assigned two interceptor squadrons.  The group was discontinued on 18 August 1955 and its personnel and equipment were transferred to the 329th Fighter Group (Air Defense) as part of Project Arrow, an Air Defense Command project to air defense groups with fighter units with distinguished histories from World War I or World War II.

History
The group was organized 1 December 1950 as the 4700th Air Base Group to replace the 4400th Air Base Group as the USAF host unit at Stewart Air Force Base, New York in preparation for the transfer of Stewart to Air Defense Command (ADC) from Continental Air Command (CONAC). It was assigned three squadrons to perform its duties as host.  The 4700th was assigned to Eastern Air Defense Force. It transferred with Eastern Air Defense Force from Continental Air Command to Air Defense Command (ADC) upon ADC's reactivation in January 1951.

The 4700th was redesignated as an air defense group in 1954 and reassigned to the 4709th Air Defense Wing with responsibility for air defense of the New York City area.  The group was assigned the 330th and the 539th Fighter-Interceptor Squadrons (FIS), which were already stationed at Stewart, flying North American F-86 Sabre fighter aircraft as its operational components.  The 330th and 539th FIS had been assigned directly to the 4709th Air Defense Wing. In January 1955, the 330th FIS and 539th FIS converted to more capable radar equipped and Mighty Mouse rocket armed North American F-86Ds.

The group was replaced by the 329th Fighter Group in 1955 as part of ADC's Project Arrow, which was designed to bring back on the active list the fighter units which had compiled memorable records in the two world wars.

Lineage
 Designated and organized as the 4700th Air Base Group on 1 December 1950
 Redesignated 4700th Air Defense Group on 20 September 1954
 Discontinued on 18 August 1955

Assignments
 Eastern Air Defense Force, 1 December 1950 – 20 September 1954
 4709th Air Defense Wing, 20 September 1954 – 18 August 1955

Station
 Stewart Air Force Base, New York, 1 December 1950 – 18 August 1955

Components
 330th Fighter-Interceptor Squadron, 20 September 1954 – 18 August 1955
 539th Fighter-Interceptor Squadron, 20 September 1954 – 18 August 1955
 612th USAF Infirmary, ca. 1 January 1954 – 18 August 1955
 4700th Installations Squadron 1 December 1950 – 18 August 1955
 4700th Maintenance & Supply Squadron (later 4700th Materiel Squadron), 1 December 1950 – 18 August 1955

Aircraft
 F-86D, 1955
 F-86F, 1954–1955

See also
 List of Sabre and Fury units in the US military
 List of United States Air Force Aerospace Defense Command Interceptor Squadrons

References

Notes

Bibliography

 Buss, (ed), Sturm, Volan, & McMullen, History of Continental Air Defense Command and Air Defense Command July to December 1955

Further reading
  Grant, C.L., (1961) The Development of Continental Air Defense to 1 September 1954, USAF Historical Study No. 126
 

Air defense groups of the United States Air Force
Aerospace Defense Command units
Four digit groups of the United States Air Force
Military units and formations established in 1950
Military units and formations in New York (state)
1950 establishments in New York (state)
1955 disestablishments in New York (state)